Beaubier may refer to:

 Cameron Beaubier (born 1992), American motorcycle racer
 David Wilson Beaubier (1864–1938), Canadian politician
 Northstar (Jean-Paul Beaubier), fictional Marvel Comics superhero
 Beaubier, Saskatchewan, Canadian hamlet